Mitchell is a 1975 American action film directed by Andrew V. McLaglen, written by Ian Kennedy Martin, and starring Joe Don Baker as an abrasive police detective. The film was released in the United States on September 10, 1975 by Allied Artists Pictures Corporation.

Very much an anti-hero, Mitchell often ignores the orders of his superiors and demonstrates disdain for by-the-book development work as well as normal social graces. The film co-stars John Saxon and Martin Balsam as the banking criminals Mitchell pursues and Linda Evans and Merlin Olsen in supporting roles as a prostitute and henchman.

The film had a resurgence after being featured in a season 5 episode of the comedy series Mystery Science Theater 3000 in 1993.

Plot
A trade union lawyer named Walter Deaney (John Saxon) kills a burglar in his house. Only an unorthodox plainclothes detective named Mitchell (Joe Don Baker) believes that Deaney is guilty of something more than self-defense, but Chief of Police Albert Pallin (Robert Phillips) tells him that Deaney is wanted for "every federal law violation in the book" and is therefore "FBI property."

To keep Mitchell away from Deaney, the Chief orders him to stake out the home of James Arthur Cummins (Martin Balsam), a wealthy man with ties to the mob whose "big scene" is the import and export of stolen merchandise. Mitchell initially is unconcerned with Cummins and focuses primarily on Deaney. But he gets drawn in after Cummins discovers that Salvatore Mistretta (Morgan Paull), cousin of his mafioso benefactor Tony Gallano (Harold J. Stone), is bringing in a shipment of stolen heroin from Mexico without Cummins' approval.

Meanwhile, a high-priced escort named Greta (Linda Evans) shows up at Mitchell's apartment. Mitchell allows her to come in, and after spending two nights with her and arresting her for possession of marijuana, he discovers that Deaney is paying her $1,000 per night to entertain Mitchell. After unsuccessfully trying to bribe Mitchell with Greta's services and an offer of an illicit real estate deal, Deaney decides to work with Cummins to eliminate the annoying cop. Deaney is killed shortly thereafter during an attempt on Mitchell's life.

Cummins refuses to let Mistretta use his port facilities to bring in the shipment, causing Gallano to send thugs to harass him. Cummins decides that the only ally he still has—aside from his faithful butler and bodyguard, Benton (Merlin Olsen)—is Mitchell, because he's no good to the police dead. In exchange for his own freedom, Cummins offers to allow Mitchell to pose as a chauffeur and pick up the shipment, putting him in a position to both confiscate the drugs and arrest Mistretta. However, Cummins double-crosses Mitchell by alerting Mistretta to his real identity. He also double-crosses Mistretta by replacing the heroin with chalk. Mistretta decides to kill Mitchell and dump the body on Cummins' boat.

Mistretta is killed in the subsequent gun battle, allowing Mitchell to go after Cummins, who is attempting to flee the country by sea. Mitchell is dropped onto the boat by helicopter and kills Benton with a gaff hook. Cummins is killed by a close-range shot from an assault rifle after one final attempted double-cross fails, bringing the central plot to a close.

Mitchell returns to his apartment to find Greta awaiting him. Mitchell brushes her off, pointing out that she is no longer being paid to keep him company. Despite this, Greta wishes to spend the night with Mitchell. However, he detects the scent of marijuana on her and the film concludes on what is intended to be a humorous beat, as Mitchell prepares to haul Greta off to jail for a second possession charge.

Alternate version
In 1980, a heavily edited version of the 1975 film was released for broadcast television, in which most of the violence and all of the nudity and profanity were removed. Several scenes in the film were shot twice for this purpose.

 Greta writes on the windshield of Mitchell's car with lipstick. In the theatrical release the word written on the windshield is "BASTARD" while in the TV version the word is "JERK."
 The sequence during the dinner scene with the phony argument between Cummins and Benton was also shot twice to substitute "goddamn awful butler" with "lousy butler".
 The scene with Mitchell arguing with a boy was edited with Mitchell saying "Buzz off, kid!" in the TV version instead of "Piss off, kid!" in the theatrical release. His remark, "Go to Hell!", to the boy as he skateboards away was also censored.

Cast

 Joe Don Baker as Mitchell
 Martin Balsam as James Arthur Cummings
 John Saxon as Walter Deaney
 Linda Evans as Greta
 Merlin Olsen as Benton
 Morgan Paull as Salvatore Mistretta
 Harold J. Stone as Tony Gallano
 Robert Phillips as Chief Albert Pallin
 Buck Young as Det. Aldridge
 Rayford Barnes as Det. Tyzack
 Todd Bass as Child
 Jerry Hardin as Desk Sergeant
 Lilyan MacBride as Rich Lady
 Robin Narke as Customs Officer (as Rob Narke)
 Sidney Clute as Rudy Moran
 Ronald "Duffy" Hambleton as Edmondo Bocca
 Carole Estes as Prudence Lang         
 Vicki Peters as Helena Jackman (as Vicky Peters)
 John Ashby as Burgular

Critical reception
Mitchell was generally panned by critics upon its release. In The New York Times, Vincent Canby wrote:

Mitchell, starring Joe Don Baker as a hard-nosed Los Angeles detective named Mitchell, has a lot of over-explicit violence, some gratuitous sex stuff and some rough language, yet it looks like a movie that couldn't wait to get to prime-time television. Perhaps it's a pilot film for a TV series, or maybe it's just a movie that's bad in a style we associate with some of the more mindless small-screen entertainments.

Mitchell spends what seems to be the greater part of the film climbing in and out of automobiles, driving automobiles, chasing other automobiles, parking automobiles, and leaning against the body of automobiles that are temporarily at rest. Once he smashes a hoodlum's hand in the door of an automobile.

The climax, for a giddy change of pace, features a police helicopter in pursuit of a high-speed cabin cruiser. Automobiles sink when driven onto water.

Said the Time Out film guide:

Baker's the big lumpy cop who won't take no and another assignment for an answer when he's told to lay off the gun-happy lawyer (Saxon) he suspects of cold-blooded murder, and to concentrate on the businessman with the coke connection (Balsam). He realises that in such a sparsely-populated cheapie they just have to be in collusion, as he punches and shoots his way to the final credits accompanied by vocal encouragement from one of those country singers with terminal cancer. Balsam and Saxon contribute no more than their required quota of urbane sneers before being bulldozed into oblivion by the golem hero of this irredeemably routine potboiler.

Mystery Science Theater 3000 episode
On October 23, 1993, the edited-for-television release of Mitchell was featured as an episode of Mystery Science Theater 3000. The film was trimmed by several minutes to match MST3K'''s format. This resulted in John Saxon's character, killed by Mitchell in a deleted scene, simply vanishing from the action. The only mention of his disappearance was a voiceover by a radio announcer stating that Saxon's character had died. Tom Servo remarks on this lapse with the question, "Hey, guys, wasn't John Saxon in this movie?" Particularly mocked were Mitchell's alcoholism, slovenliness and uncouth behavior. During the opening credits, Servo and Crow mock the theme song by improvising lyrics about food and Mitchell's weight, briefly referencing the theme song from Shaft.

According to page 97 of the Mystery Science Theater 3000 Amazing Colossal Episode Guide, the cast had heard a rumor that actor Joe Don Baker was very angry at the MST3K treatment of Mitchell, and threatened physical violence on any of the cast or crew, should he ever meet them in person. This did not stop them from later featuring (and happily mocking) another of Baker's films, Final Justice, and hurling even more vicious insults at Baker. Kevin Murphy, who played MST3K's robot commentator Tom Servo, as well as serving as one of the show's writers, later said Baker likely meant it in a joking manner. Nevertheless, MST3K head writer and star Michael J. Nelson stated that he avoided running into Baker when he discovered that they were both staying at the same hotel.

The episode is also notable for its host segment's subplot involving Gypsy, who overhears the Mads plotting to kill their new temp, Mike, and mistakenly thinks they are planning to kill Joel. Working with Mike, Gypsy locates an escape pod and uses it to "save" Joel's life, ending his imprisonment on the Satellite of Love. The Mads then abandon their plan to fire Mike, and instead send him to the SoL to replace Joel.

The episode was chosen by fans to appear in the MST3K 2016 Turkey Day Marathon. The episode finished third in a poll of MST3K Season 11 Kickstarter backers. Writer Jim Vorel ranked the episode the eighth best in his rankings of the show's first 11 seasons (191 episodes), and Season 11 head writer Elliott Kalan selected Mitchell as his ninth-favorite MST3K episode.

The MST3K version of the film was released on VHS by Rhino Home Video on September 1, 1998 and was reissued on DVD in November 2001 with the theatrical trailer as an extra. On November 26, 2013, Shout! Factory re-released the MST3K version of the film as a bonus feature on their 25th Anniversary Edition DVD boxed set.

It was also the final episode that featured the show's creator Joel Hodgson as the subject of the "experiments". At the end of the episode, Michael J. Nelson steps in to fill his shoes after Joel leaves.

Music

The film's theme song, "Mitchell," was performed by country music singer Hoyt Axton.

See also
 List of American films of 1975

References

External links

Mitchell annotated and explained
A list of cultural references in the Mystery Science Theater'' cut.

1975 films
1970s crime action films
Allied Artists films
American crime action films
1970s English-language films
Fictional portrayals of the Los Angeles Police Department
Films directed by Andrew McLaglen
Films scored by Jerry Styner
American police detective films
1970s rediscovered films
Rediscovered American films
1970s American films